The 1952 UMass Redmen football team represented the University of Massachusetts Amherst in the 1952 college football season as a member of the Yankee Conference. The team was coached by Charlie O'Rourke and played its home games at Alumni Field in Amherst, Massachusetts. The 1952 season was O'Rourke's first as coach of the Minutemen, and was his only winning season with the team. UMass finished the season with a record of 4–3–1 overall and 1–2 in conference play.

Schedule

References

UMass
UMass Minutemen football seasons
Umass Redmen football